Khvares (also Romanized as Khvāres, Khovārs, and Khūvāres) is a village in Kamalabad Rural District, in the Central District of Karaj County, Alborz Province, Iran. At the 2006 census, its population was 44, in 21 families.

References 

Populated places in Karaj County